Augustine Patrick Spillane (10 May 1888 – 16 September 1974) was a New Zealand rugby union player. Gus Spillane came from a Temuka rugby family of Irish descent and one steeped in rugby. Three of his brothers also represented South Canterbury with one, Charles, later moving to Wanganui and Taranaki and becoming prominent in refereeing and administration. The Spillane Cup, the traditional trophy competed for at Easter by North Island Marist clubs, is named after Charles Spillane.
Primarily a tidyfirst five-eighth, Spillane represented South Canterbury at a provincial level, and was a member of the New Zealand national side, the All Blacks, in 1913. He appeared in two matches for the All Blacks, both of them internationals against the touring Australian team, in which he played at second-five eighth.

He also captained South Canterbury against the tourists midweek between the Dunedin and Christchurch tests.<Profile by Lindsay Knight
for the New Zealand Rugby Museum>.

Between 1911, when he was 23, and 1923, when he was 35, he played 21 matches for South Canterbury. Much of this span was of course interrupted by World War I.

George Gaffaney, also a South Canterbury and South Island five eighths of the 1930s, recalled playing against Spillane while a young man and spoke glowingly of his talent.

Said Gaffaney of Spillane: "A wily tactician with an uncanny ability to extricate himself and his team from awkward situations. Spillane, by his very presence, was worth several points to any Temuka team - even before the match started."

He died in Timaru in 1974, and was buried at Temuka Cemetery.

References

1888 births
1974 deaths
People from Geraldine, New Zealand
New Zealand rugby union players
New Zealand international rugby union players
South Canterbury rugby union players
Rugby union fly-halves
Rugby union centres
New Zealand rugby union referees
Burials at Temuka Cemetery